Waupaca is a city in and the county seat of Waupaca County in the U.S. state of Wisconsin. The population was 6,282 at the 2020 census.

The city is located mostly within the Town of Waupaca, and it is politically independent of the town. A portion extends west into the adjacent Town of Farmington, and there is also a noncontiguous area of the city in the Town of Lind to the south. The city is divided into natural areas, city areas, and industrial areas.

History 
Native American mound builders lived in the area prior to European settlement. At one time there were 72 earthwork mounds in the area, some of them ancient prehistoric works.

“Waupaca” is an Menominee word, Wāpahkoh, which means Place of Tomorrow Seen Clearly. For more than 10,000 years, the Menominee occupied about 10 million acres, including Waupaca and the Chain O’Lakes area. The Menominee in the Waupaca area moved between large villages on Taylor and Otter Lakes and camps along the falls on the Waupaca River.

In a series of seven treaties, the Menominee ceded their lands to the United States. The final treaty, in 1848, relinquished the last of the Menominee’s land, which included Waupaca.

The first white settlers, five men from Vermont, came to Waupaca looking for “the falls” in 1849. The settlers made camp near the end of what is now North Main Street with plans to harness the power of the falls and establish a community.

By 1852, a post office had been established and the settlement was officially named Waupaca. Waupaca was incorporated as a village on May 4, 1857 by an act of the Wisconsin State Legislature. This act was repealed on April 7, 1862, but revived on June 17 of the same year. Waupaca was incorporated as a city by the legislature on March 5, 1875.

Beginning in the 1960s and continuing to the present, the city has expanded its population and area through annexation.

Geography
Waupaca is located at  (44.354922, -89.081775).

Climate

Transportation 

From 1899 to 1926, streetcar service was provided by the Waupaca Electric Light and Railway Company.

Airport

KPCZ - Waupaca Municipal Airport

Demographics

2020 census
As of the census of 2020, the population was 6,282. The racial makeup of the city was 91.3% White, 1.1% Black or African American, 1.0% Asian, 0.6% Native American, 1.4% from other races, and 4.6% from two or more races. Ethnically, the population was 4.0% Hispanic or Latino of any race.

2010 census
As of the census of 2010, there were 6,069 people, 2,702 households, and 1,356 families residing in the city. The racial makeup of the city was 96.6% White, 0.9% African American, 0.7% Native American, 0.3% Asian, 0.5% from other races, and 1.0% from two or more races. Hispanic or Latino of any race were 2.3% of the population.

There were 2,702 households, of which 25.9% had children under the age of 18 living with them, 34.9% were married couples living together, 10.9% had a female householder with no husband present, 4.4% had a male householder with no wife present, and 49.8% were non-families. 42.9% of all households were made up of individuals, and 20.7% had someone living alone who was 65 years of age or older. The average household size was 2.10 and the average family size was 2.92.

The median age in the city was 40.1 years. 22.1% of residents were under the age of 18; 8.4% were between the ages of 18 and 24; 24.7% were from 25 to 44; 24.6% were from 45 to 64; and 20.1% were 65 years of age or older. The gender makeup of the city was 47.5% male and 52.5% female.

2000 census
At the 2000 census, there were 5,676 people, 2,364 households and 1,302 families residing in the city. The population density was 947.0 per square mile (365.9/km2). There were 2,543 housing units at an average density of 424.3 per square mile (163.9/km2). The racial makeup of the city was 96.26% White, 0.33% Black or African American, 0.86% Native American, 0.25% Asian, 0.02% Pacific Islander, 1.39% from other races, and 0.88% from two or more races. 3.42% of the population were Hispanic or Latino of any race.

There were 2,364 households, of which 29.5% had children under the age of 18 living with them, 40.5% were married couples living together, 10.6% had a female householder with no husband present, and 44.9% were non-families. 38.1% of all households were made up of individuals, and 18.2% had someone living alone who was 65 years of age or older. The average household size was 2.25 and the average family size was 3.01.

Age distribution was 25.4% under the age of 18, 9.5% from 18 to 24, 27.0% from 25 to 44, 17.9% from 45 to 64, and 20.2% who were 65 years of age or older. The median age was 36 years. For every 100 females, there were 88.2 males. For every 100 females age 18 and over, there were 84.9 males.

The median household income was $31,095, and the median family income was $45,128. Males had a median income of $32,488 versus $21,651 for females. The per capita income for the city was $18,890. About 7.1% of families and 10.5% of the population were below the poverty line, including 12.9% of those under age 18 and 12.0% of those age 65 or over.

Business and industry 

Waupaca Foundry is the largest employer in the city, employing over 1500 workers in three plants in or around the city. Most of the employees live within  of the city. Gusmer Enterprises, Inc., with a manufacturing plant on Ware Street, produces products for the food and beverage, industrial and pharmaceutical markets.

Notable people
 Edward E. Browne, United States Representative
 Edward L. Browne, legislator
 Daniel F. Burnham, legislator
 George H. Calkins, legislator and physician
 Clarence Ekstrom, U.S. Navy Vice Admiral
 Fred R. Fisher, legislator
 Robert Frederick Froehlke, lawyer and government official
 Brock Jensen, NFL quarterback
 Greg Johnson, curler 
 Edwin J. Larson, legislator
 Alfred R. Lea, legislator
 Reid F. Murray, United States Representative
 Clay Perry, writer, coined the word "spelunker"
 Kevin David Petersen, legislator
 Brian Rafalski, NHL defensemen 
 Richard E. Peterson, legislator, lawyer
 Myron Reed, legislator, lawyer
 Lyall Schwarzkopf, Minnesota state legislator
 Milan H. Sessions, legislator, lawyer
 Joseph H. Woodnorth, legislator

Sister cities
Waupaca has two sister cities:
  Hochheim am Main, Hesse, Germany
  Mitoyo, Kagawa Prefecture,  Japan

Images

See also
Waupaca Railroad Depot

References

Further reading
 Dewey, Freeman Dana. Early History of Waupaca, Wis.. 1887.

External links

 Waupaca Historical Society
City of Waupaca
 Waupaca Area Chamber of Commerce
 Waupaca Area Public Library
 Sanborn fire insurance maps: 1885 1891 1895 1901 1909

 
Cities in Wisconsin
Cities in Waupaca County, Wisconsin
County seats in Wisconsin